Lomas de Carrasco is a residential area in the Canelones Department of southern Uruguay.

Geography

Location
It is joined with La Tahona and Carmel to its west and south and Villa El Tato to the northwest. It is part of the wider metropolitan area of Montevideo.

Population
In 2011 Lomas de Carrasco had a population of 806.
 
Source: INE - 2004 census

References

External links
INE map of Villa Aeroparque, Villa El Tato, Lomas de Carrasco, Carmel and Altos de la Tahona

Populated places in the Canelones Department